Beijing Social and Economic Research Institute was the first independent political think tank in China, which was created in 1986 by members of the Beijing Spring group, in an aftermath of the Democracy Wall events of 1978–79. It closed after the Tiananmen Square protests of 1989.

References

1986 establishments in China
1989 in China
Chinese democracy movements
Political and economic think tanks based in China
Think tanks established in 1986